Kelve Road is a railway station on the Western line of the Mumbai Suburban Railway network. Kelve Road is located in Palghar district of Maharashtra state in Konkan division. Kelve Road railway station is between the Virar-Dahanu local train service. All Dahanu Road bound local trains from Mumbai Western Rail route halt at this station. This is the third station after Virar moving towards Dahanu Road.

kelve road is very popular for there clean beaches and dam.
Many tourist visiting here throughout the year to see the beaches and dams.
kelwa beach is 2 km distance away from kelve railway station.

Railway stations in Palghar district
Mumbai Suburban Railway stations
Mumbai WR railway division